Iridopterygidae was a family of praying mantids in the order Mantodea whose members, having formerly been moved here as a subfamily within Mantidae, have now been transferred elsewhere as part of the recent (2019) major revision of mantid taxonomy.

Former subfamilies
 Hapalomantinae: moved to new family Nanomantidae
 Iridopteryginae: now consists of two tribes in the Gonypetidae
 Nanomantinae: now in new family Nanomantidae contained:
 Tribe Fulcinini
 Tribe Nanomantini
 Nilomantinae: now a tribe of Hapalomantinae
 Tropidomantinae: previously containing a single tribe, the Tropidomantini
 genera previously placed incertae sedis here are now the Tropidomantinae.

See also
List of mantis genera and species

References

 
 

 
Mantodea families
Taxa named by Ermanno Giglio-Tos
Obsolete arthropod taxa